John Steven Broussard (July 19, 1949 – June 1, 2021) was an American professional football player who was a punter in the National Football League (NFL).

Early life and education
Broussard was born in McComb, Mississippi. He graduated in 1967 from Notre Dame High School in Biloxi, where he excelled in four sports, was quarterback of the football team, and was a successful Golden Gloves boxer. He was inducted into the Biloxi Sports Hall of Fame in 2012. He played football at Marion Military Institute, the University of Southern Mississippi, and Auburn University. He then became director of the Ocean Springs Racquet Club & Spa.

Career
Broussard tried out as a free agent with the New Orleans Saints in 1975, playing in exhibition games. Three weeks after being waived by the Saints, he was signed by the Green Bay Packers. He played four games. In the September 21, 1975 season opener against Detroit, Bart Starr's first as Packers coach, three of his punts were blocked, setting an NFL record for most punts blocked in a game. He later attended training camps with the Tampa Bay Buccaneers in their inaugural season, 1976, and in 1977.

Later life and death
Broussard became a disc jockey, playing music of the late 1950s through the 1970s. He died in Biloxi at the age of 71.

See also

List of Green Bay Packers players

References

1949 births
2021 deaths
People from McComb, Mississippi
Green Bay Packers players
American football punters
University of Southern Mississippi alumni
Auburn Tigers football players
Southern Miss Golden Eagles football players
Players of American football from Mississippi